This is a list of episodes for the fifth and final season of the TV series Charlie's Angels. Originally broadcast from November 30, 1980 to June 24, 1981 for a total of 17 episodes, the season starred Jaclyn Smith, Cheryl Ladd, David Doyle, and introduced Tanya Roberts as streetwise former model Julie Rogers, the only "angel" not to graduate from the Police Academy.

Since the show's third season, ratings were in decline. Producers believed that replacing Shelley Hack with a new "Angel" would improve viewing figures, but with this season's timeslot being continually changed during its run, ratings continued to fall. As a result of the scheduling, the show dropped to a lowly #59 in the Nielsen chart, leading ABC to cancel the series after the season concluded.

Main cast
Jaclyn Smith as Kelly Garrett (regular) 
Cheryl Ladd as Kris Munroe (regular) 
Tanya Roberts as Julie Rogers (regular) 
David Doyle as John Bosley (regular) 
John Forsythe as  Charles "Charlie" Townsend (regular, voice only)

Notable guest stars
Jack Albertson 
Jane Wyman 
Soon-Tek Oh (4 episodes) 
Barbi Benton 
Richard Anderson
Sally Kirkland
Eric Braeden
Barbara Luna
Joyce Brothers 
Sonny Bono
Christopher Lee
Anne Francis
Cameron Mitchell
Randolph Mantooth

Episodes

References

05
1980 American television seasons
1981 American television seasons